The Langman Baronetcy, of Eaton Square in the City of Westminster, was a title in the Baronetage of the United Kingdom.  It was created on 21 July 1906 for the philanthropist Sir John Langman.  The title became extinct on the death of the third Baronet in 1985.

Langman baronets, of Eaton Square (1906)
Sir John Lawrence Langman, 1st Baronet (1846–1928)
Sir Archibald Lawrence Langman, 2nd Baronet (1872–1949)
Sir John Lyell Langman, 3rd Baronet (1912–1985)

References

Extinct baronetcies in the Baronetage of the United Kingdom